Sunset Kids is the eighth studio album by New York singer/songwriter Jesse Malin. It was released on August 30, 2019 by Wicked Cool Records and The Orchard. The album was produced by Lucinda Williams and Tom Overby, and features performances by Lucinda Williams, Billie Joe Armstrong, and Joseph Arthur.

Track listing

Recording and production 
Sunset Kids was produced by Lucinda Williams and engineered by David Bianco and Geoff Sanoff. The album was recorded on both coasts between the two artists' touring schedules. Two songs were co-written by Lucinda Williams including the first single, "Room 13." Other guests that appear on the album are Billie Joe Armstrong of Green Day, who co-wrote and sings on "Strangers and Thieves," and singer songwriter Joseph Arthur who appears on three tracks.

Reception 
Reviews for the album were mostly positive, gaining an 81 out of 100 score on review aggregating site Metacritic. Rolling Stone called it "a celebration of survival that finds the New York City hardcore troubadour reflecting on life’s precious and fleeting moments." American Songwriter said "each of these 14 tracks is an exquisitely constructed gem." Americana UK said "(the songs) fit together here into a triumph a record which must rank among the best of Malin’s career and among the best of this year."

References

External links 
 Sunset Kids at Last.fm

2019 albums
Jesse Malin albums
Albums produced by Lucinda Williams